The Rey Commission is the European Commission that held office from 2 July 1967 to 30 June 1970. Its president was Jean Rey.

Work

It was the first commission of the merged European Communities. It was the successor to the Hallstein Commission and was succeeded by the Malfatti Commission. The commission worked to reinforce the Communities' institutions and increase the powers of the European Parliament. It also campaigned for an elected parliament, which was achieved later in 1979. It oversaw the competition of the customs union in 1968.

Rey played an important role the Summit of The Hague in 1969, where the European leaders decided to relaunch European integration with two new initiatives: on the one hand, Economic and Monetary Union of the European Union (EMU), and on the other hand, European Political Cooperation (EPC), which foreshadow the euro and the Common Foreign and Security Policy of the European Union today. 

Finally, in 1970, the last year of this mandate, Rey managed to win the European governments' support for his proposal to give the Community "own resources".   This meant that the EEC no longer depended exclusively on contributions by the member states, but could complete these with revenues from customs duties, levies on agricultural products from outside the EEC, in addition to a share of the VAT revenue.

Membership
The commission was composed of 14 members, 3 from Italy, West Germany, and France, 2 from Belgium and the Netherlands and 1 from Luxembourg.

Summary by political leanings
The colour of the row indicates the approximate political leaning of the office holder using the following scheme:

References

External links
 European Commission Website
 PDF Archive of Commission Membership (not all Rey Commission members included)
 PDF Analysis of Political Experience of Commission Membership by UK politician Tom King and the Centre for Policy Studies
 NATIONAL BANK OF BELGIUM, August 2004 Working Paper on Macroeconomic and Monetary policy-making at the European Commission 1957 to 1969

 
European Commissions